Zaraka Monastery is a ruined Frankish abbey near Stymfalia, in the Peloponnese, in Greece. It was built about a kilometre from the shores of Lake Stymphalia, the site of the ancient city of Stymphalus, during the "Frankokratia", i.e. the occupation of parts of the Byzantine Empire by Franks and Venetians, following the events of the Fourth Crusade in 1204, and the establishment of the Latin Empire of Constantinople and Greece.

History

The monastery was built by monks of the Cistercian Order, in c. 1225. What is particularly noteworthy about this monastery is that it the only one actually built by the Cistercians in Greece (out of the approx. 17-19 houses throughout Greece), since in all other occasion the Cistercians had occupied existing Greek Orthodox monasteries that had been abandoned by the Greek monks.

In this respect it is one of the exceptionally few samples of western Gothic architecture in Greece, along with the (most likely Benedictine) monastery of Isova in the western Peloponnese (just north of the village of Trypiti). It was initially excavated by Professor Anastasios Orlandos in the 1920s and then by E. Stikas in the 1960s before a joint project by the Canadian Institute at Athens and the Archaeological Society of Athens prepared the first detailed state plan of the church in 1984.  Excavations from 1993 to 1996 by the Pontifical Institute of Medieval Studies at the University of Toronto uncovered areas around the gate house and the cloister.

Some scholars believe that the abbey had been built in the same location, or general area as an ancient Greek temple dedicated to Artemis, which is supported by the fact that materials from a temple have been extensively used in the buildings of the monastery; it is possible, however, that these elements (reused column drums, for example) came from the ancient city a few hundred metres away.

The monastery makes sporadic appearance in the Statutes of the Cistercian General Chapter and it was one of the houses granted special exemption from the compulsory annual attendance at the General Chapter, and along with the houses in Syria and the Crusader States it was only required to attend once every seven years. The monastery was abandoned in 1276.
 
The main surviving structures are the imposing vaulted gate house and the church, especially its western end as well as parts of the defensive wall around the monastery.  Excavation to the NE of the east end of the church (possibly a narthex was originally planned but never completed) revealed an arched entrance probably to the refectory which had fallen in an earthquake.  The PIMS excavations demonstrated that the abbey was resettled in the late 14th century and inhabited perhaps intermittently until the mid 16th century.  A number of graves from this later reoccupation were excavated in and around the cloister, including a headless man and one with a German banker's token of the mid 16th century.

Sources 
 E. A. R. Brown 'The Cistercians in the Latin Empire of Constantinople and Greece, 1204-1276', Traditio vol.14 (1958), 63-120
 B. Kitsiki-Panagopoulos, Cistercian and Mendicant Monasteries in Medieval Greece (Chicago : University of Chicago Press, 1979)
 P. Lock, The Franks in the Aegean, 1204-1500 (Longman, 1995)
 D. H. Williams, The Cistercians in the Early Middle Ages, 1098-1348 (Gracewing, 1998)
 Excavation report my Sheila D. Campbell

External links
Official website

Cistercian Order
Christian monasteries established in the 13th century
Medieval Corinthia
Buildings and structures in Corinthia
Roman Catholic monasteries in Greece
Principality of Achaea
History of Catholicism in Greece
Gothic architecture in Greece
Ruined abbeys and monasteries
Ruins in Greece
Medieval sites in Peloponnese (region)